Eteri Georgievna Tutberidze (the native name is Eteri Gogievna, ; born 24 February 1974) is a Russian figure skating coach who works mainly with female single skaters. She is head coach at the Sambo 70 skating club in Moscow. She has coached several Russian skaters to success in international competitions, including 2022 Olympic and 2021 World champion Anna Shcherbakova, 2022 Olympic silver medalist and two-time Junior World champion Alexandra Trusova, 2022 Olympic Team champion and 2020 Junior World champion Kamila Valieva, 2020 European Champion Alena Kostornaia, 2018 Olympic and 2019 World champion Alina Zagitova, two-time World champion and two-time 2018 Olympic silver medalist Evgenia Medvedeva, and 2014 Olympic Team champion Yulia Lipnitskaya.

Personal life
Eteri Georgievna Tutberidze was born 24 February 1974 in Moscow. The youngest of five children, she is half-Georgian, a quarter Russian, and a quarter Armenian. Her mother was a senior engineer at the Ministry of Agricultural Construction and her father worked at the Likhachev plant's foundry and as a taxi driver.

Tutberidze studied at the Academy of Physical Education in Malakhovka and received a degree in choreography from the Institute of Contemporary Art. During her six years in the United States, she lived in Oklahoma City, Cincinnati, Los Angeles, and San Antonio. Her daughter, Diana, was born on 16 January 2003 in Las Vegas. Diana was coached by her mother as a single skater until 2016 when, at the insistence of her mother, she opted for ice dance.

Skating career
Tutberidze began skating at the age of four and a half, guided by Evgenia Zelikova and then Edouard Pliner. After sustaining a spinal fracture and growing 22 cm, she switched from singles to ice dancing. She was coached by Lidia Kabanova for two years and then joined Elena Tchaikovskaya, who paired her with Vyacheslav Chichekin. After briefly training under Natalia Linichuk, Tutberidze switched to Gennady Akkerman, her coach for the next three years. She skated with Alexei Kiliakov until he emigrated to the United States.

During the 1991–1992 season, Tutberidze trained under Tatiana Tarasova before deciding to perform in ice shows. Appearing as an adagio pair skater with Nikolai Apter, she toured with Ice Capades for several years.

She worked in ice shows in the US for six years in the 1990s, including in Oklahoma at the time of the 1995 Oklahoma City bombing, for which she received compensation as a survivor.

Coaching

Tutberidze began coaching in San Antonio, Texas. After returning to Russia, she coached at several Moscow rinks, including a hockey rink Serebrianyi, where ice time was limited for figure skaters. She then moved to Sambo 70 (SDUSSHOR 37) in Moscow, where she collaborates with Sergei Dudakov and Daniil Gleikhengauz.

Seniors

Juniors
 Sofia Akatieva  →  2023 Russian champion, 2021 Russian junior champion, 2020 Russian junior silver medalist, 2021 Cup of Russia Final junior champion, 2021 JGP Poland champion, 2021 JGP Russia champion.

 Egor Rukhin  (until February 2020, rejoined in 2021 after JGP series) → 4th at 2019 JGP France.
 Daniil Samsonov  → 2019 Junior Grand Prix Final bronze medalist, 2019 and 2020 Russian junior champion, 2019 JGP Latvia bronze medalist, 2019 JGP Poland champion.

Former students
 Polina Shelepen  <ref *="" polina="" shelepen (from age four until July 2012), two-time JGP Final silver medalist.
 Yulia Lipnitskaya   (from 2009 until November 2015), 2014 European champion, 2014 Olympic champion in the team event, 2014 World silver medalist.
 Adian Pitkeev   (until March 2016), 2014 World Junior silver medalist, 2013–14 JGP Final silver medalist.
 Sergei Voronov  (from mid-2013 until March 2016), 2014 European silver medalist, 2014–2015 GP Final bronze medalist.
 Serafima Sakhanovich  (during 2014–2015 season), 2015 World Junior silver medalist, 2014–2015 JGP Final silver medalist.
 Polina Tsurskaya   2016 Youth Olympic champion, 2015–16 JGP Final champion.
 Ilia Skirda  JGP event silver medalist at two JGP events, qualified for 2016-17 JGP Final.
 Daria Panenkova  (until July 2018), JGP event gold and silver medalist, qualified for 2017-18 JGP Final.
 Anastasia Tarakanova  (during 2017-2018 season), 2017–18 JGP Final bronze medalist.
 Alena Kanysheva  (during 2019-2020 season), 2018-19 JGP Final bronze medalist.
 Alexey Erokhov  (until July 2020), 2018 Junior World champion.
 Elizaveta Berestovskaya  (until May 2021)
 Elizabet Tursynbayeva  (2012-2013, June 2018 - September 2021), 2019 World silver medalist, 2019 Four Continents silver medalist, 2019 Winter Universiade silver medalist.
 Diana Davis  (until 2016 as a single skater, daughter of Eteri Tutberidze)
 Kamilla Gainetdinova  (as a single skater)
 Yasmina Kadyrova  (as a single skater)
 Polina Korobeynikova  (as a child)
 Daria Pavliuchenko  (as a single skater)
 Vladimir Samoilov 
 Vladislav Tarasenko  (as a single skater)
 Alena Kostornaia  (2017–2020, March 2021–March 2022), 2020 European champion, 2019 Grand Prix Final champion, 2018 Junior Grand Prix Final champion, 2018 Junior World silver medalist
 Veronika Zhilina  (as a child)
 Evgenia Medvedeva  2013–14 Grand Prix of Figure Skating Final junior ladies bronze medalist, 2014 World Junior Figure Skating Championships bronze medalist, 2014–15 Grand Prix of Figure Skating Final junior ladies champion, 2015 World Junior Figure Skating Championships champion, 2015–16 Grand Prix of Figure Skating Final ladies champion, 2016 World Figure Skating Championships champion, 2016 European champion, 2016–17 Grand Prix of Figure Skating Final ladies champion, 2017 World Figure Skating Championships champion, 2017 European champion, 2018   Olympic Games team silver medalist, women's singles silver medalist.
 Alexandra Trusova  (2016–May 2020, May 2021–October 2022) 2022 Olympic silver medalist, Two-time European bronze medalist (2020, 2022), 2019 Grand Prix Final bronze medalist, 2022 Russian champion, 2019 Russian silver medalist, 2020 Russian bronze medalist, Two-time Junior World champion (2018, 2019), 2017 Junior Grand Prix Final champion, Two-time Russian Junior champion (2018, 2019).
 Morisi Kvitelashvili   2020 European bronze medalist, 2021 Rostelecom Cup champion, Two-time Rostelecom Cup silver medalist (2018, 2020), 2018 and 2022 Olympian, 2022 Worlds 4th place

Controversies
Tutberidze's coaching methods have been criticized by fans, journalists and skaters, especially in the wake of Kamila Valieva's doping scandal at the 2022 Beijing Olympics. The knowledge of the Sambo-70 club encouraging dehydration, starvation and unchanged practice regime despite injuries had been public even before Beijing, and critics had also noticed Tutberidze's students regularly retiring with serious injuries before the age of 18. Several of her male students, such as Daniil Samsonov and Adian Pitkeev, also suffered serious injuries under her training.

Valieva's doping controversy during the Olympics in 2022 saw a new wave of critical articles and figure skaters speaking out, with Romain Haguenauer, who coaches in Montreal, claiming that Tutberidze's training is "abusive, military even" and that "she wouldn't be allowed near children" if she used those practices in Montreal as a coach. Choreographer Benoît Richaud also spoke about the unsustainability of those methods and shortened careers. Figure skaters Adam Rippon and Katarina Witt publicly expressed support for Valieva, claiming that "adults around her have completely failed her" (Rippon) and that "the responsible adults should be banned from the sport forever" (Witt).

IOC president Thomas Bach expressed concern for Valieva's wellbeing, commenting "[Valieva] was received by her closest entourage with what appeared to be a tremendous coldness, it was chilling to see this, rather than giving her comfort, rather than to try to help her." President Vladimir Putin's spokesperson Dmitry Peskov called Bach's comments "deeply inappropriate", stating that "the harshness of a coach in high-level sport is key for their athletes to achieve victories."

References

1974 births
Living people
Figure skaters from Moscow
Russian figure skating coaches
Russian people of Armenian descent
Russian people of Georgian descent
Female sports coaches